Charlotte Fry (born 11 February 1996) is an Olympic, European Championships and World Championships medal-winning British dressage rider.

Personal story
A daughter of Laura Fry, who competed at the 1992 Summer Olympic Games in Barcelona, Charlotte Fry started riding at a young age. Aged 14, she started training with Olympic Champion Carl Hester, having weekly lessons from the age of 16. Hester told former Danish Olympiad Anne van Olst about Fry, after which Fry moved to the Netherlands to train with van Olst. Since 2012 she has lived and worked alongside her boyfriend in the Netherlands.

Career
In 2018 Fry became World Champion during the World Championships for Young Horses in Ermelo, riding Glamourdale in the 7-years old division. She also won at the 2018 European Championships for Grand Prix riders under the age of 25 in Exloo, Netherlands, with her horse Dark Legend.

Fry competed at the 2019 European Championships in Rotterdam where she placed 4th with the British dressage team. She continues to train in Den Hout, the Netherlands with former Danish Olympian Anne van Olst. 

She was selected to represent Great Britain during the Olympic Games in Tokyo, Japan. She won the bronze team medal and ended 13th in the individual competition. A month later she won gold at the World Championships for Young Horses in Verden with the Dutch-bred Kjento.

In the 2022 FEI World Championships  in Herning, Denmark, Charlotte competed Glamourdale to win Gold in both the Individual Grand Prix Special and the Individual Grand Prix Freestyle. On December 16th, 2022, the pair won the 5th leg of the FEI Dressage World Cup, West Europe League, with a personal best of 90.995% in the Freestyle.

References

External links

Fry's page at Olympedia.org

1996 births
Living people
British female equestrians
British dressage riders
English female equestrians
Equestrians at the 2020 Summer Olympics
Olympic equestrians of Great Britain
Medalists at the 2020 Summer Olympics
Olympic medalists in equestrian
Olympic bronze medallists for Great Britain
People from Driffield
Sportspeople from Scarborough, North Yorkshire